Conquerors of Armageddon is the third album by Brazilian death metal band Krisiun and their first under the Century Media label. As such, this is considered the band's breakthrough release.

Track listing

Personnel
 Moyses Kolesne – guitars
 Max Kolesne – drums
 Alex Camargo – bass, vocals
 Andy Classen – engineer/producer
 Erik Rutan – producer
 Joe Petagno – cover artwork

Krisiun albums
2000 albums
Albums produced by Andy Classen
Albums with cover art by Joe Petagno
Century Media Records albums